Akash Malhotra (born 12 December 1972) is an Indian former cricketer. He played 54 first-class matches for Delhi between 1993 and 2000.

See also
 List of Delhi cricketers

References

External links
 

1972 births
Living people
Indian cricketers
Delhi cricketers
Cricketers from Delhi